Dear My Friends is a 2017 Chinese drama television series directed by Cui Liang and starring Song Dandan, Liu Lili, Vivian Wu, Zhu Yin, Yvonne Yung and Zhang Ruoyun. The series is an adaptation of the 2016 South Korea television series Dear My Friends. The series premiered in China via iQiyi and Hunan Television starting December 10, 2017.

Synopsis
This drama describes the stories between Ma Weihua and her friends in their last years of life, people who say some words like "It is not the end, we're still alive".

Cast

Main
 Song Dandan as Ma Weihua, landlady of a restaurant, divorced, Gu Jiayi's mother.
 Liu Lili as Shi Huizhen, a retired housewife.
 Vivian Wu as Qiu Ya, a celebrity.
 Zhu Yin as Yan Shunhua, Ma Weihua's friend.
 Yvonne Yung and She Muzi, landlady of a club.
 Zhang Ruoyun as He An'ning, a popular cartoonist. Gu Jiayi's boyfriend.

Supporting
 Jiang Yan as Gu Jiayi, Ma Weihua's daughter, He An'ning's girlfriend, an Internet writer.
 Du Yuan as Xu Jianshe, Shi Huizhen's husband.
 Qin Han as Song Shuhao
 Yan Minqiu as Ji Shuying
 Xu Li as Xu Jiawen
 Qian Yongchen as Jing Hao
 Wang Ce as Wang Weiguo
 Qiu Yueli as Fu Gui
 Qi Han as Ji Zijun
 Cheng Qimeng as Xiao Pan
 Yu Heng as Yu Deshui
 Shu Yaoxuan as Ma Shouyi
 Zhao Zhengyang as Guan Zhiqiang

Music

Broadcast
Dear My Friends was released on December 10, 2017 in China. As of December 26, the series has had 3 million plays via iQiyi.

Reception
The drama received mixed reception. On Douban, the series has a score of 6.2 out of 10.

Ratings 

 Highest ratings are marked in red, lowest ratings are marked in blue

References

External links
 
 
 

2017 Chinese television series debuts
Chinese drama television series
Chinese television series based on South Korean television series
Television series by EE-Media
2018 Chinese television series endings
Television shows written by Noh Hee-kyung
Television series about families